{{DISPLAYTITLE:C5H8O5}}
The molecular formula C5H8O5 (molar mass: 148.12 g/mol, exact mass: 148.0372 u) may refer to:

 Citramalic acid
 alpha-Hydroxyglutaric acid